Campaign streamers of the American Revolutionary War are a set of campaign streamers that military units participating in designated actions are allowed to display. The basic American Revolutionary War streamer is scarlet with a white center stripe, and a golden yellow inscription identifying the action. Scarlet is the color of the mother country and the white stripe symbolizes the virgin land of the new country separated from its former sovereign by force of arms.

Participation in the following actions in the American Revolutionary War qualifies a military unit's standard to include a campaign streamer with the given designation:
 Lexington: The Battles of Lexington and Concord on April 19, 1775
 Ticonderoga: The Capture of Fort Ticonderoga on May 10, 1775
 Boston: The Siege of Boston, from April 19, 1775, to March 17, 1776
 Quebec: The Invasion of Quebec, from August 28, 1775, to July 1776
 Charleston: The Battle of Sullivan's Island (near Charleston, South Carolina) on June 28, 1776
 Long Island: The Battle of Long Island on August 27, 1776
 Trenton: The Battle of Trenton on December 26, 1776
 Princeton: The Battle of Princeton on January 3, 1777
 Saratoga: The Saratoga campaign, from July 30 to October 17, 1777
 Brandywine: The Battle of Brandywine on September 11, 1777
 Germantown: The Battle of Germantown on October 4, 1777
 Monmouth: The Battle of Monmouth on June 28, 1778
 Savannah: The Capture of Savannah on December 29, 1778
 Savannah: The Siege of Savannah, from September 16 to October 10, 1779
 Charleston: The Siege of Charleston, from March 29 to May 12, 1780
 Camden: The Battle of Camden on August 16, 1780
 Cowpens: The Battle of Cowpens on January 17, 1781
 Guilford Court House: The Battle of Guilford Court House on March 16, 1781
 Yorktown: The Siege of Yorktown from September 28 to October 19, 1781

References
 

Awards and decorations of the United States Army
Campaigns of American wars